Michel Ndary Adopo (born 19 July 2000) is a French professional footballer who plays as a midfielder for Italian  club Torino.

Club career
Adopo made his professional debut with Torino in a 2–0 Serie A win over Roma on 5 January 2020. 

On 29 January 2021, he joined Serie C club Viterbese on loan. On 5 August 2021, the loan was renewed for the 2021–22 season.

On 11 January 2023, he scored in a 0-1 Coppa Italia win over Milan in San Siro

Personal life
Born in France, Adopo is of Ivorian, Senegalese, indian, and vietnamese descent.

References

External links

Lega Serie A Profile

2000 births
Living people
Sportspeople from Villeneuve-Saint-Georges
French sportspeople of Ivorian descent
French footballers
Association football midfielders
Serie A players
Serie C players
Torino F.C. players
U.S. Viterbese 1908 players
French expatriate footballers
French expatriate sportspeople in Italy
Expatriate footballers in Italy
France youth international footballers
Footballers from Val-de-Marne